Pholo may be,

Pholo language
Tsoanelo Pholo
Mpho Pholo